This is a list of the transfers for the 2010–11 A-League season. It includes all transfers to an A-League club, but not all players leaving A-League clubs. Promotions from youth squads to the first squad of the same club are also not included.

1 Player on 10 match Guest contract with club. 
2 Players who sign before transfer window will join new club on 1 January 2011.
3 Player on a six-month contract with Sydney FC for their AFC Champions League campaign and then will return to the Fury.
4 Player on a three-month contract with Sydney FC for their AFC Champions League campaign and then will return to the Phoenix.

References

A-League Men transfers
trans
Football transfers summer 2010
Football transfers winter 2010–11
Football transfers winter 2009–10